The Enquirer Media is a company in Cincinnati, Ohio.  The company has a portfolio of over 50 print and digital brands (including The Cincinnati Enquirer, The Kentucky Enquirer, Cincinnati.com, NKY.com).  Other brands in the Enquirer Media include The Community Press and Recorder, Our Town, Deal Chicken, CareerBuilder.com, Cars.com, Homefinder.com and Apartments.com.

Recent history
In October 2005 The Enquirer launched NKY.com, a Web site covering news from the Northern Kentucky counties of Boone, Campbell and Kenton. This was one of the first newspaper-published Web sites to make extensive use of user-created content, featured prominently on its 38 community pages.

In April 2006, The Enquirer was cited by The Associated Press with the news cooperative's General Excellence Award, naming The Enquirer as the best major daily newspaper in Ohio. Earlier that year, parent Gannett Co. named The Enquirer the most improved of the more than 100 newspapers in the chain.

In August 2006, cincinnati.com launched 186 community pages for Ohio and Indiana towns and neighborhoods. Cincinnati.Com began soliciting and publishing stories and articles from the public. Readers-submitted content also is extensively featured in Your HomeTown Enquirer, six zoned twice-weekly local news sections published on Thursday and Saturday in Hamilton, Butler, Warren and Clermont counties.

In August 2011, Enquirer Media announced it had signed a letter of intent with The Columbus Dispatch for the possible printing of The Cincinnati Enquirer and The Kentucky Enquirer in a new, more compact, easy-to-use format. In July 2012, Enquirer Media publisher Margaret Buchanan wrote a column detailing the new print edition and inviting readers to or in person.

References

Mass media companies of the United States
Companies based in Cincinnati